Heroes of Might and Magic: Quest for the Dragon Bone Staff is a 2001 video game released on the PlayStation 2. Though 3DO did not advertise it as such, the game is an enhanced remake of King's Bounty. It is primarily a graphics enhancement and it appears that little of the text has changed. Because of its dated gameplay, the game bears little relation to the rest of the Heroes of Might and Magic series.

Reception

The game received "mixed" reviews according to the review aggregation website Metacritic. Daniel Erickson of NextGen said that the game was "Not as deep as the PC series it's named after, but just as fun and much more accessible."

References

External links

2001 video games
Cancelled Game Boy Advance games
Heroes of Might and Magic
PlayStation 2 games
PlayStation 2-only games
Single-player video games
The 3DO Company games
Turn-based strategy video games
Video game remakes
Video games scored by Paul Romero
Video games scored by Steve Baca